Jesús Rubio (born 29 March 1945) is a Colombian footballer. He played in three matches for the Colombia national football team in 1975. He was also part of Colombia's squad for the 1975 Copa América tournament.

References

External links
 

1945 births
Living people
Colombian footballers
Colombia international footballers
Place of birth missing (living people)
Association football defenders
Deportes Tolima footballers
Unión Magdalena footballers
Atlético Junior footballers
Millonarios F.C. players